The Udhana-Palsana Industrial Corridor in the Indian state of Gujarat is a region comprising more than 1000 industries of metal, textile, pharmaceuticals, plastic and chemical.  The region is a 32 km long belt which is one of the busiest industrial zones in Asia. The corridor starts near UM road in Udhana and ends up in Palsana. The GIDCs in this belt are Udhana GIDC, Khatodara GIDC, Pandesara GIDC, Vadod GIDC, Sachin GIDC, Bhestan GIDC, Hojiwala INA, Unn GIDC, and Palsna GIDC.

There is a project passed by the state government to start Bus Rapid Transit System (BRTS) on this route to enhance the superiority of the belt with the nearby townships. The BRTS will start from Udhana Darwaja and will end up in Sachin in the first phase and in the second phase from Sachin to Palsana. Thus the commuting time on this industrial belt will decrease by an hour.

Udhana is the headquarters of industrial belt region and thus Udhana will be connected rapidly with the other nearby regions by BRTS as per plan.  Though the conversion of CC road and six-lane project of Udhana-Sachin phase is finished but it lacks rapid transport.

The Surat metro will pass through the belt which will be a boon for the congested belt and would save one's commuting time from one hour to 15 minutes.  The belt will be upgraded to international standards as per plans of State government and Corporation.  The belt would also have good connectivity with New Surat International Airport and the port of Magdalla and Hazira.

The full-fledged completion of belt will be completed by 2012.

References 

Economy of Gujarat
Economy of Surat
Industrial corridors in India